The 1929 Wimbledon Championships took place on the outdoor grass courts at the All England Lawn Tennis and Croquet Club in Wimbledon, London, United Kingdom. The tournament was held from Monday 24 June until Saturday 6 July 1929. It was the 49th staging of the Wimbledon Championships, and the third Grand Slam tennis event of 1929.

Champions

Men's singles

 Henri Cochet defeated  Jean Borotra, 6–4, 6–3, 6–4

Women's singles

 Helen Wills defeated  Helen Jacobs, 6–1, 6–2

Men's doubles

 Wilmer Allison /  John Van Ryn defeated  Ian Collins /  Colin Gregory, 6–4, 5–7, 6–3, 10–12, 6–4

Women's doubles

 Peggy Michell /  Phoebe Watson defeated  Phyllis Covell /  Dorothy Shepherd-Barron 6–4, 8–6

Mixed doubles

 Frank Hunter /  Helen Wills defeated  Ian Collins /  Joan Fry, 6–1, 6–4

References

External links
 Official Wimbledon Championships website

 
Wimbledon Championships
Wimbledon Championships
Wimbledon Championships
Wimbledon Championships